This is a list of Damash Gilans results for the 2009–10 season. The club is competing in the Azadegan League and Hazfi Cup. By the end of the season Damash finish second on the league and was qualified for the promotion playoffs but they were eliminated in the playoff game against Sanat Naft and missed out on promotion

2009-2010 Squad

First-team squad 

*
*
*
*

Notes
These players didn't finish the season with Damash Gilan

Squad statistics

Azadegan League Schedule

Damash in Azadegan League 2009/10 Classification

Azadegan League Summary of Results

Promotion Play Off

|}

First leg

Return leg

Damash Hazfi Cup Schedule

Goalscorers

Squad changes during 2009/10 season

In

Out

References
Azadegan League Statistics
Persian League

Damash Gilan seasons
Dam